The Erie–Meadville, PA Combined Statistical Area (CSA) is made up of two counties in northwestern Pennsylvania. The United States Office of Management and Budget has recognized the Erie and Meadville areas along with the counties of Erie and Crawford to make a Combined Statistical Area, located in northwestern Pennsylvania. Though these county line boundaries are rather arbitrary since Erie serves as the regional hub for the bordering areas of southwestern New York and northeastern Ohio (including the cities of Jamestown and Conneaut). As of the 2010 United States Census the CSA had a population total of 369,331. The Combined Statistical Area ranked 7th in the state of Pennsylvania and 102nd in the United States.

Erie, PA Metropolitan Statistical Area
 Erie County – population 280,566

Cities/major boroughs
 Corry
 Edinboro
 Erie
 Girard
 Lake City
 Lawrence Park
 North East
 Northwest Harborcreek
 Union City
 Wesleyville

Meadville, PA Micropolitan Statistical Area
 Crawford County – population 88,765

Cities/major boroughs
 Meadville
 Titusville

See also
 List of Metropolitan Statistical Areas
 List of Combined Statistical Areas

References

Geography of Erie County, Pennsylvania
Geography of Crawford County, Pennsylvania
Combined statistical areas of the United States